Antero Puranen is a Finnish Olympic javelin thrower. He represented his country in the men's javelin throw at the 1980 Summer Olympics. His distance was an 84.02 in the qualifiers and an 85.12 in the finals.

References

Living people
1952 births
Finnish male javelin throwers
Olympic athletes of Finland
Athletes (track and field) at the 1980 Summer Olympics